Hisao (written: 央生, 久生, 久雄, 寿雄, 寿夫, 尚雄, 尚久 or 尚勇) is a masculine Japanese given name. Notable people with the name include:

, Japanese voice actor
, Japanese government official
, Japanese baseball player
, Japanese footballer and manager
, Japanese footballer and manager
, Japanese botanist
, Japanese pole vaulter
Hisao Oguchi, Japanese businessman
, Japanese footballer
Hisao Shinagawa (born 1946), Japanese singer-songwriter
, Japanese musicologist
Hisao Tanaka (1921–1991), American professional wrestler
, Japanese general
, Japanese computer scientist
, Japanese sprint canoeist

Japanese masculine given names